Idris Barzani (1944 – January 31, 1987) was a Kurdish politician in the Kurdistan Region. He was the brother of Massoud Barzani, the former president of the Kurdistan Region and the father of Nechervan Idris Barzani, the current president of the Kurdistan Region. He was often on diplomatic trips for the Kurdistan Democratic Party He died on January 31, 1987, of a heart attack.

Idris Barzani was one of the most prominent political figures in Kurdish politics, spending his entire life serving the Kurdish cause alongside his father Mullah Mustafa and brother Massoud Barzani. Barzani was known to be the peacemaker figure among the Kurdish parties after the 1975 Algiers Agreement between Shah Pahlavi and Saddam Hussein which led to the Collapse of the Peace Accord. In the 1980s, Idris Barzani repeatedly attempted to hold a Kurdish Congress gathering the Kurds to unify the Kurdish political parties but his early sudden death didn't allow him to finish his duty.

Life

Early life
Idris was born in 1944 in Barzan, a village in Iraqi Kurdistan, he moved to Mahabad with his father, family and thousands of peshmergas to join the newly established Republic of Mahabad which lasted only 11 months, afterward Barzani moved back to Barzan while his father Mullah Mustafa and 500 of his followers went to Soviet Union refusing to surrender to the neighboring regimes who oppressed the Kurdish people. Barzani in an early age of his life joined the Peshmerge serving in 1960's revolutions.

Iraqi - Kurdish Autonomy Agreement 1970
On 10 March 1970, the Iraqi regime then finally reached an agreement with the Kurds for the creation of an autonomous region in Northern Iraq. Idris Barzani played a major role in processing the agreement, he and president Barzani went to Baghdad on 11 March 1970, coming before a rally of hundreds of thousands of Iraqi people who were celebrating the day.

Exile
Following the collapse of the peace accord in 1975, Barzani, along with his family and thousands of Kurdish families settled in Iran and the KDP went through a chaotic period as it attempted to reorganize itself in face of the defeat at the hands of the Ba'ath in Iraq.

After Mullah Mustafa's death in 1979 Congress of KDP held in 1979. Idris Barzani, became a KDP top strategist under the party leadership of his brother President Barzani. He often represented the party in the west, lobbying for the Kurdish rights.

Idris Barzani suddenly died with a heart attack on 31 January 1987, he was buried in Iranian Kurdistan in Oshnavieh. On October 1993, his body was brought across the border from Iran to Iraqi Kurdistan to be reburied in Barzan.

References

1944 births
1987 deaths
Iraqi Kurdish people
Kurdish nationalists
Kurdish politicians